The following is a partial list of the "V" codes for Medical Subject Headings (MeSH), as defined by the United States National Library of Medicine (NLM).

This list continues the information at List of MeSH codes (N05). Codes following these are found at List of MeSH codes (V02). For other MeSH codes, see List of MeSH codes.

The source for this content is the set of 2006 MeSH Trees from the NLM.

– publication components (publication type)

– abstracts (publication type)

– advertisements (publication type)

– animation (publication type)

– architectural drawings (publication type)

– bibliography (publication type)
  – biobibliography (publication type)

– biography (publication type)

– book illustrations (publication type)
  – caricatures (publication type)
  – drawings (publication type)
  – maps (publication type)
  – pictorial works (publication type)

– bookplates (publication type)

– charts (publication type)

– comment (publication type)

– editorial (publication type)

– english abstract

– letter (publication type)

– news (publication type)

– patient education handout (publication type)

– published erratum (publication type)

– retraction of publication (publication type)

The list continues at List of MeSH codes (V02).

V01